Tachanun or Taḥanun ( "Supplication"), also called nefilat apayim ( "falling on the face"), is part of Judaism's morning (Shacharit) and afternoon (Mincha) services, after the recitation of the Amidah, the central part of the daily Jewish prayer services. It is also recited at the end of the Selichot service. It is omitted on Shabbat, Jewish holidays and several other occasions (e.g., in the presence of a groom in the week after his marriage). Most traditions recite a longer prayer on Mondays and Thursdays.

Format
There is a short format of Tachanun and there is a long format. The long format is reserved for Monday and Thursday mornings, days when the Torah is read in the synagogue. The short format, recited on other weekdays mornings and on weekday afternoons, consists of three (in some communities two) short paragraphs.

According to the Nusach Sefard and most Sephardic rites, Tachanun begins with vidduy (confessional prayer) and the Thirteen Attributes; in Spanish and Portuguese and some Moroccan communities, these are recited only in long Tachanun. In this prayer several sins are mentioned and the heart is symbolically struck with the right fist during mention of each sin. This is followed by the mention of God's thirteen attributes of mercy. By and large, Sephardim do not rest their head on their hand for Kabbalistic reasons, but Spanish and Portuguese Jews and some Moroccans, who never accepted many Kabbalistic customs, do rest their head on their hand.

Short Tachanun
In most Nusach Ashkenaz communities, Tachanun begins with introductory verses from II Samuel (24:14), and then continues with a short confession that we have sinned and God should answer our prayers, followed by Psalm 6:2-11, which King David composed - according to traditional sources - while sick and in pain.  In most Nusach Sefard communities, they also recite these verses, although only after reciting Vidui and the Thirteen Attributes.

In the Sephardic rite, Italian rite and  Romaniote - adopted also in some Nusach Sefard communities, including Chabad - Psalm 25 is recited as Tachanun.

In the presence of a Torah scroll, this paragraph is recited with the head leaning on the back of the left hand or sleeve (in most Ashkenazic communities, one leans on the right hand when wearing tefillin on the left).

The next paragraph, "" ("Guardian of Israel") is recited seated, but erect (some communities recite it only on fast days).

After this point, and following the words "va'anachnu lo neida", it is customary in many communities to rise, and the remainder of the final paragraph is recited while standing; others (especially those who don't recite שומר ישראל on a daily basis) remain seated but erect for this passage. Tachanun is invariably followed by "half kaddish" at Shacharit and by "full kaddish" at Mincha and in Selichot.

Long Tachanun
The Talmud (Bava Kamma) marks Monday and Thursday as "eth ratzon", a time of Divine goodwill, on which a supplication is more likely to be received. On Monday and Thursday mornings, therefore, a longer prayer is recited.  The order differs by custom:

In Nusach Ashkenaz, a long prayer beginning "ve-hu rachum" is recited before niflat apayim.  After Psalm 6, a few stanza with a refrain "Hashem elokey Yisra'el" is added.  The service then continues with Shomer Yisra'el (in some communities this is recited only on Fast Days) and Tachanun is concluded as normal. In some Nusach Ashkenaz communities, especially in Israel, they have adopted the Sephardic custom to recite Vidui and Thirteen Attributes at the beginning of long Tachanun; in some of these places, this is omitted during the Selichot season during which Vidui and Thirteen Attributes were recited right before the service, so they revert to the older custom of not reciting it.

In Nusach Sefard, the order is Vidui, Thirteen Attributes, nefilat apayim, "ve-hu rachum", "Hashem elokey Yisra'el", Shomer Yisra'el, and Tachanun is concluded as normal.
 
In the Sephardic rite, there are two variations:
The older custom (maintained by Spanish and Portuguese and some Moroccan Jews) is to recite the Thirteen Attributes, "Anshei Amanah Avadu" (on Monday) or "Tamanu me-ra'ot" (on Thursday), another Thirteen Attributes, "al ta'as imanu kalah", Vidui, "ma nomar", another Thirteen Attributes, "ve-hu rachum", nefilat apayim, "Hashem ayeh chasadech ha-rishonim" (on Monday) or "Hashem she'arit peletat Ariel" (on Thursday), and Tachnun is concluded as on other days.

Most Sephardic communities today have adopted a different order, based on the Kabbalah of the Ari.  This order includes vidui, "ma nomar", Thirteen Attributes, nefilat apayim, which is concluded as every day.  After this, another Thirteen Attributes, "Anshei Amanah Avadu", another Thirteen Attributes, "Tamanu me-ra'ot", another Thirteen Attributes, "al ta'as imanu kalah", and Tachnun concludes with "ve-hu rachum".

In the Italian rite, several verses from Daniel are recited - these verses are included in "ve-hu rachum" recited in other rites, but the prayer in Italian rite is much shorter. This is followed by Thirteen Attributes, Vidui, "ma nomar", nefilat apayim, Psalm 130, a collection of verses from Jeremiah and Micah, a piyyut beginning "Zechor berit Avraham" (this is different from the famous selicha of Zechor Berit known in other rites), Psalm 20, and Tachanun is concluded as on other days.

The Yemenite rite did not originally include any additions for Monday and Thursday.  However, due to influence of other communities, they have adopted the following order: nefilat apayim, Thirteen Attributes, "al ta'as imanu kalah", Vidui, "ma nomar", another Thirteen Attributes, "ve-hu rachum", "Hashem ayeh chasadech ha-rishonim" (on Monday) or "Hashem she'arit peletat Ariel" (on Thursay), and Tachnun is concluded as on other days.

History
The source of the supplicatory prayer (Taḥanun) "is in Daniel (9:3) and I Kings (8:54), where the verses indicate that prayer should always be followed by supplication. Based on this, Talmudic sages developed the habit of adding a personal appeal to God following the set prayers (some examples are listed in the Babylonian Talmud, Berachot 16b). In the fourteenth century, these spontaneous supplications were standardized and turned into the prayer of Tachanun."

The custom of bending over and resting the face on the left hand is suggested by the name of Tachnun used in Halachic literature - nefilat apayim (literally 'falling on the face'). It is also reminiscent of the Daily Sacrifice brought in the Temple, which was laid on its left side to be slaughtered. A person's arm should be covered with a sleeve, tallit, or other covering. This posture, developed in the post-Talmudic period, is symbolic of the original practice, in which people lay down with their faces touching the ground to show humility and submission to God. The pose was also used by Moses and Joshua, who fell on their faces before God after the sin of the Golden calf.

Because Joshua fell on his face before the Ark of the Covenant, Ashkenazi custom is that one puts one's head down only when praying in front of an Ark containing a Torah scroll. Otherwise, it is proper to sit with the head up.One source says that where the ark, containing a valid (non-Pasul) Sefer Torah can be seen from where one is sitting, then head down, if not, not. The same source reports a custom of in-the-next-room, and notes that it is not universally accepted.

The article also has three other head-down situations: (a) some, in Jerusalem; (b) Sefer Torah without an ark; (c) at home, if one "knows at exactly what time the congregation recites Tachanun in the synagogue. In a different article, Rabbi Moshe Feinstein is cited as saying that "because Jerusalem is such a holy city" it is as if we're in the presence of a Sefer Torah. It also makes a case for "in the same room" and advises, "If not, then you say it sitting without putting your head down."

The longer version recited on Mondays and Thursdays is traced by classical sources (see e.g., S. Baer, Siddur Avodath Yisrael) to three sages who had escaped the destruction of the Jewish community in the Holy Land by the Romans. While on a ship on the way to Europe, they were caught in a storm, and all three recited a personal prayer, after which the storm subsided. These sages went on to establish communities in Europe. David Abudirham states that the words "rachum ve-chanun" ("merciful and gracious") mark the beginning of the next segment.

Days on which Tachanun is omitted
Tachanun is omitted from the prayers on Shabbat, all the major holidays and festivals (including Chol HaMoed, the intermediate days of Pesach and Sukkot), Rosh Chodesh (new moon), Hanukkah and Purim, as these days are of a festive nature and reciting Tachanun, which is mildly mournful, would not be appropriate.

The following is a list of all the other days, "minor holidays", when tachanun is excluded from the prayers, and Psalm 126 is recited during Birkat HaMazon. It is typically also omitted from the Mincha prayers the preceding afternoon, unless otherwise noted:

It is also not recited in the house of a mourner (reasons vary: either so as not to add to the mourner's grief by highlighting God's judgment, or because a mourner's house is a house of judgment, and a house of judgment is not a suitable place for requesting mercy; see bereavement in Judaism), nor is it said in the presence of a groom in the sheva yemei hamishte (the seven celebratory days subsequent to his marriage; see marriage in Judaism). Additionally, Tachanun is omitted in a synagogue when a circumcision is taking place in the synagogue at that time, and when either the father of the baby, the sandek (the one who holds the baby during the circumcision), or the mohel (the one who performs the circumcision) is present.

Some Nusach Sefard communities omit Tachanun during mincha, primarily because it was common for Hasidic congregations to pray mincha after sunset, in which case some hold that Tachanun needs be omitted. Additionly, many Hasidic communities omit Tachanun on the anniversary of the death of various Rebbes (except Lubavitch makes a point of saying), since that is considered a day for religious renewal and celebration. There is a Hasidic custom of omitting Tachanun the entire week of Purim (11-17 Adar) and the entire week of Lag BaOmer (14-20 Iyar). Some Chasidic communities omit Tachanun on 7 Adar because it is the anniversary of the death of Moses. Additionally some Hasidic congregations omit Tachanun on Friday mornings (getting ready for Shabbat), and some even on Sunday mornings (revival from Shabbat).

In many congregations, it is customary to omit Tachanun on holidays established by the State of Israel: Yom Ha'atzmaut (Independence Day), 5 Iyar (most years, date changes depending on day of week); and Yom Yerushalayim (the anniversary of the reunification of Jerusalem in 1967), 28 Iyar. Some communities in the Diaspora will also omit Tachanun on civil holidays in their own country (such as Thanksgiving in the United States).

References

External links 
 Jewish Encyclopedia
 Jewish Virtual Library
 Naphillath Panim A historical perspective on Tachanun from a Yemenite and Maimonidean perspective.
 The Prayer Of Our Fathers  Has translation of and guidance on how to pray the Amidah and Tachanun according to the Mishneh Torah
 Tahanun in Jewish Encyclopedia
  Forms of Adoration in Jewish Encyclopedia
 Rav Kook on Psalm 6, the Tachanun psalm for Ashkenazim

Jewish prayer and ritual texts
Hebrew words and phrases
Hebrew words and phrases in Jewish prayers and blessings
Siddur of Orthodox Judaism
Hebrew words and phrases in Jewish law